Kosuke Takeuchi (竹内 公輔、born January 29, 1985 in Suita, Osaka, Japan) is a Japanese professional basketball player. He plays for the Utsunomiya Brex of the B.League.
Takeuchi also is a member of the Japan national basketball team, playing for the team in the 2006 FIBA World Championship and both the FIBA Asia Championship 2007 and FIBA Asia Championship 2009.

As a 21-year-old, Takeuchi averaged 5.4 points and 4.4 rebounds per game for the host Japanese at the 2006 FIBA World Championship.  Takeuchi has earned a bigger role with the Japanese team over the past four years; his best tournament performance to date was at the FIBA Asia Championship 2009, in which he averaged 13 points and a team-leading 8.2 rebounds per game.  Despite his performance, Japan stumbled to a disappointing tenth-place finish, its worst ever performance in 24 FIBA Asia Championship appearances. He was invited to play with the Minnesota Timberwolves during the 2010 summer league in Las Vegas in 2010.

Takeuchi  played professionally with the Aisin Seahorses of the JBL Super League.  In the 2009-10 season, Takeuchi entered the month-long winter break averaging 15.4 points and 11.3 rebounds per game for the first-place Seahorses.  He was also named to the JBL All-Star Game as the leading power forward vote-getter for the West.

Career statistics

Regular season 

|-
| align="left" | JBL 2007-08
| align="left"  rowspan="4" | Aisin
| 35 || || 35.3 || .549 || .415 || .719 || 9.7 || 1.1 || 0.8 || 1.8 || 1.2 || 14.3 
|-
| align="left" | JBL 2008-09
| 35 || || 37.7 || .565 || .403 || .805 || 10.0 || 1.1 || 0.6 || 1.9 || 1.6 || 18.3 
|-
| align="left" | JBL 2009-10
| 42 || || 38.0 || .539 || .246 || .661 || 11.0 || 1.2 || 0.8 || 2.0 || 1.6 || 15.8
|-
| align="left" | JBL 2010-11
| 36 || || 37.2 || .578 || .353 || .741 || 11.0 || 1.6 || 0.6 || 1.8 || 1.8 || 16.8 
|-
| align="left" | JBL 2011-12
| align="left" rowspan="3" | Toyota
| 36 || || 23.3|| .543 || .000 || .727 || 6.8 || 1.2 || 0.5 || 1.2 || 1.1 || 10.6 
|-
| align="left" | JBL 2012-13
| 38 || || 25.2 || .472 || .000 || .605 || 7.2 || 0.9 || 0.7 || 1.0 || 1.2 || 9.3 
|-
| align="left" | NBL 2013-14
| 37 || 18|| 21.6 || .607 || .333 || .676 || 6.8 || 0.7 || 0.5 || 0.8 || 0.9 || 10.7 
|-
| align="left" | NBL 2014-15
| rowspan="2" align="left" | Hiroshima
| 46 || || 31.8|| .526 || .357 || .771 || 8.4 || 1.4 || 0.7 || 0.9 || 1.3 || 14.0
|-
| align="left" | NBL 2015-16
|  || || ||  ||  ||  ||  ||  ||  ||  ||  || 
|-

References

1985 births
Living people
Sportspeople from Osaka Prefecture
Asian Games bronze medalists for Japan
Asian Games medalists in basketball
Basketball players at the 2006 Asian Games
Basketball players at the 2010 Asian Games
Basketball players at the 2014 Asian Games
Hiroshima Dragonflies players
Japanese men's basketball players
Medalists at the 2014 Asian Games
Power forwards (basketball)
SeaHorses Mikawa players
People from Suita
2006 FIBA World Championship players
Twin sportspeople
Japanese twins